Maria Blasucci is an American actress and comedy writer. She is best known for roles in television shows including Family Tree on HBO and Ghost Ghirls on Yahoo Screen.

Her basketball team is the subject of The Pistol Shrimps, a documentary produced by Morgan Spurlock that premiered at the 2016 Tribeca Film Festival.

She was an on-set writer for Neighbors 2: Sorority Rising.

She currently stars in the Comedy Central series Drunk History and can be seen as Jessica Mundt in Mascots on Netflix.

She is a co-founder of the Earios podcast network where she co-hosts The Big Ones as well as serves as producer and fan favorite of WebCrawlers.

She is a frequent guest star on the podcast Spontaneanation hosted by Paul F. Tompkins on Earwolf.

She graduated from Marymount High School and earned a degree in theater arts at Loyola Marymount University in 2008.

She studied improv comedy at IO West.

Maria holds the high score record for Anteater, the arcade game.

References

External links

Living people
Year of birth missing (living people)
American comedy writers
Loyola Marymount University alumni
21st-century American actresses
Place of birth missing (living people)